Beijing Township is a township under the administration of Linyi County in southwestern Shanxi, China. , it has 29 villages under its administration.
Beijing Village
Beili Village
Dong Village
Jing Village
Nanjing Village
Qi Village
Shijiazhuang Village
Xi Village
Zhang Village
Dayan Village
Zhaizhuang Village
Gaojiazhuang Village
Jiazhuang Village
Jiaojiaying Village
Jingzhuang Village
Luo Village
Majiayao Village
Nanzhuang Village
Weizhuang Village
Beizhi Village
Chenzhuang Village
Fengxian Village
Lijiazhuang Village
Nandachen Village
Nandian Village
Nanxue Village
Xichenzhai Village
Yanjiazhuang Village
Zhangbai Village

References 

Township-level divisions of Shanxi
Linyi County, Shanxi